John Charles Mills (born 28 November 1941) is an Australian politician who represented Wallsend in the New South Wales Legislative Assembly for the Labor Party from 1988 to 2007.

Mills was awarded a Bachelor of Science (Hons), and a Master of Science. He was a previously an industrial chemist with BHP. He is married with two children. He represented Wallsend for the Labor Party from 1988 to 2007.

Notes

 

Living people
1941 births
Place of birth missing (living people)

Members of the New South Wales Legislative Assembly

Australian Labor Party members of the Parliament of New South Wales

21st-century Australian politicians